KCAB-LP was a low-power television station serving western Pinal County, Arizona, as an America One affiliate. It provided analog over-the-air service on UHF channel 28 from its transmitter in downtown Casa Grande, Arizona, and was available on various area cable providers. KCAB-LP was owned by Central Arizona Broadcasting, LLC. of Casa Grande.

History
On October 18, 2002, the FCC granted an original construction permit to build a licensed low-power television station on channel 27, to be K27HF.

Prior to completing construction, Central Arizona Broadcasting realized the potential for interference on channel 27 from Phoenix station KAZT-CA, and applied to the FCC to move to channel 28. The FCC granted the application and the station was licensed on October 27, 2005, taking the call sign of KCAB-LP. It was the second television station licensed to Casa Grande and the first station to air locally produced programming.

In 2009, KCAB filed an application to return to channel 47 as a digital channel. Together with a transmitter move, the 15 kW signal would reach Casa Grande, Arizona City, Eloy, Maricopa, Chandler, Gilbert and other parts of the eastern Phoenix suburbs, and Florence. Currently, signal coverage is limited to Casa Grande only.

The station closed after the FCC denied the digital application.

Programming
KCAB-LP aired most of the schedule from America One television. Local programming included a newscast at 6:30PM and 10:00PM called News 28 Prime. Other local programs included Rox Tales, Travel Talk, Community Conversations and Sandi's Show. Sports features included home basketball games from Central Arizona College in nearby Coolidge.

References

External links
 America one 

CAB-LP
Television channels and stations established in 1999
Casa Grande, Arizona
Defunct television stations in the United States
Television channels and stations disestablished in 2014
CAB-LP
1999 establishments in Arizona
Television networks in the United States